The BCCI Corporate Trophy was an Indian cricket competition. It was established in 2009 by the Board of Control for Cricket in India (BCCI) as a 12-team inter-corporate tournament beginning at the start of the Indian cricket season before the start of the Ranji Trophy competition. This tournament was a 50-over a side tournament involving corporate teams. All the top Indian cricketers were expected to play along with academy cricket players and those who play regular domestic cricket in India.

History
The corporate trophy acts as a high-profile starter to the Indian domestic cricket season. The BCCI's prime objective is to promote employment opportunities for domestic cricketers in India's corporate houses. The board has invited 12 corporate teams to take part which will involve some of India's top cricketers.

The winners collect  10 million (204,272) while the runners-up receive  5 million (102,109) however, unlike the Indian Premier League (IPL) no foreign players would take part.

The tournament initially involved players formerly from the now-defunct Indian Cricket League (ICL). Some of the ICL players said that after the announcement of the Corporate Trophy, they had received calls from their employers asking them to cut ties with the rebel league.

The inaugural was won by Air India Red after they beat Air India Blue by 93 runs in the final.

2014 teams

Group A
Andhra Bank: Arjun Yadav (c), Shoaib Ahmed, Neeraj Bist, Mohammed Khader, Abhinav Kumar, Sarvesh Kumar, Lalith Mohan, Pagadala Naidu, Dwaraka Ravi Teja, Ashish Reddy, Naveen Reddy, Ronald Roy Rodrigues, Amol Shinde, Hanuma Vihari
Chemplast: Hemanth Kumar (c), Mayank Agarwal, V Ashwin, Robin Bist, Piyush Chawla, Napoleon Einstein, H Gopinath, Rajamani Jesuraj, Prasanth Parameswaran, Murthy Prabhu, P Sakthi, Rajagopal Sathish, Sandeep Sharma, Gowjith Subhash, Rangaraj Suthesh, Murali Vijay
Income Tax (India): Amol Ubarhande (c), Subramanian Anand, Ajitesh Argal, Sangram Atitkar, Puneet Bisht, Aniket Choudhary, Rohit Dahiya, Jay Desai, Vaibhav Deshpande, Ashish Hooda, Ravi Jangid, Amol Jungade, Iresh Saxena, Bhavik Thaker, Aditya Waghmode
Indian Oil Corporation: Rajesh Pawar (c), Syed Abbas Ali, Amit Dani, Murtuza Hussain, Paresh Patel, Mandar Phadke, Rohan Raje, Balwinder Sandhu, Pinal Shah, Ravikant Shukla, Vikrant Yeligati

Group B
Comptroller and Auditor General: Jalaj Saxena (c), Imtiyaz Ahmed, Sachin Baby, Avi Barot, Ankur Julka, Rameez Khan, Ankit Lamba, Bibhudutta Panda, Biplab Samantray, Saurya Sanandiya, Aditya Sarwate, Bravish Shetty, Rituraj Singh, Arpit Vasavada, Shrikant Wagh
Madras Rubber Factory: Yaleeka Gnaneswara Rao (c), Varun Aaron, Srikkanth Anirudha, Prashanth Chandran, Yalaka Venugopal Rao, Sunil Sam, Thalaivan Sargunam, Sridharan Sriram, Umashankar Sushil, Sandeep Warrier
Oil & Natural Gas Corporation: Unmukt Chand (c), Amit Bhandari, Prashant Bhandari, Gautam Gambhir, Praveen Kumar, Saurabh Kumar, Vikramjeet Malik, Mithun Manhas, Sumit Narwal, Ajay Ratra, Sandeep Sharma, Suhail Sharma, Tanmay Srivastava
State Bank of Travancore: Vinan Nair (c), Pallam Anfal, Perumparambath Anthaf, K Chandrasekhara, Sony Cheruvathur, Raiphi Gomez, VA Jagadeesh, Vinod Kumar (cricketer), Abhishek Mohan, Kevin Oscar, Karimuttathu Rakesh, S Ramakrishnan, Chovvakkaran Shahid, Kanakkatharaparambu Sreejith, Chandra Tejas

Group C
Bharat Petroleum Corporation Limited: Suryakumar Yadav (c), Kiran Adhav, Swapnil Hazare, Vinit Indulkar, Uday Kaul, Onkar Khanvilkar, Abhishek Nayar, Saurabh Netravalkar, Pragyan Ojha, Manish Pandey, Anup Revandkar, Aavishkar Salvi, Bhavin Thakkar, Rajesh Verma
Bharat Sanchar Nigam Limited: Joginder Singh (c), Sanjay Bamel, Niranjan Behera, Kuldeep Diwan, Satish Kumar, Kamlesh Makvana, Rohit Mehra, NS Negi, Bikas Pati, Sourav Sarkar, Sumeet Sharma, Brijesh Tomar
Canara Bank: Neravanda Aiyappa (c), Rajoo Bhatkal, G Chaitra, Bharat Chipli, Deepak Chougule, Sunil Joshi, Mansur Ali Khan, David Mathias, Srinivasa Murthy, KB Pawan, C Raghu, B Rajashekhar, Ravikumar Samarth
State Bank of Hyderabad: Tirumalasetti Suman (c), Alfred Absolem, Akash Bhandari, Khushal Jilla, Ravi Kiran, Pawan Kumar, Daniel Manohar, Anoop Pai, Syed Quadri, Vishal Sharma, Anirudh Singh, M Srinivas, Bodapati Sumanth, Ashwin Yadav

Group D
Air India: Yuvraj Singh (c), Rajat Bhatia, Manvinder Bisla, Royston Dias, Sushant Marathe, Naman Ojha, RG Pal, Rashmi Parida, Sachin Rana, Sonu Sharma, Pankaj Singh, Paul Valthaty
Tata Sports Club: Ajit Agarkar (c), Saurabh Tiwary, Mandeep Singh, Sufiyan Shaikh, Satish Gaikwad, Usman Malvi, Arya Moheet, Gaurav Jathar, Ramesh Powar, Nikhil Patil, Shardul Thakur, 
India Cements: Dinesh Karthik (c), Baba Aparajith, Palani Amarnath, Subramaniam Badrinath, Lakshmipathy Balaji, Baba Indrajith, Arun Karthik, Suresh Kumar, Abhinav Mukund, Ramaswamy Prasanna, Rahil Shah, Yo Mahesh
State Bank of Mysore: Balachandra Akhil (c), Kayan Abbas, Sreenath Aravind, KC Avinash, Pavan Deshpande, Aniruddha Joshi, Anand Katti, MK Manjunath, Syed Nooruddin, C Sasikumar, HS Sharath, Chethan William

2009 tournament
The 1st round takes place from 1–3 September with the 12 teams split into 4 groups of 3. The group winners will play in semi-finals on 5 and 7 September and the final being played on 8 September. The winners will receive Rs 10 million with the runners-up receiving Rs 5 million.

Air India Red won the tournament by beating Air India Blue by 93 runs in the final.

Group stages

Group A

Group B

Group C

Group D

Knockout stages

Semi-finals

Final

References

2009 in cricket
Indian cricket in the 21st century
Indian domestic cricket competitions
List A cricket competitions